Magdagachi is an urban locality (an urban-type settlement) and the administrative center of Magdagachinsky District of Amur Oblast, Russia, located  northwest of Blagoveshchensk. Population:

History

It was established in 1910 in connection with the construction of the Amur Railway; both the settlement and the railway station were named after the stream called Magdagachi, which flows into a tributary of the Amur River. Magdagachi was granted urban-type settlement status in 1938.

Climate
Magdagachi experiences a monsoon-influenced humid continental climate (Köppen Dwb) bordering upon a subarctic climate (Dwc) with very cold, dry winters and warm, humid, and rainy summers.

Transportation
Magdagachi has a station on the Trans-Siberian Railway  from Moscow). The M58 "Amur" highway traverses it as of 2010.
There is also a small regional airport (IATA Code GDG, UHBI), but it is not currently in service.

References

Notes

Sources

External links
Photo of central part of train station
View of train station from viaduct

Urban-type settlements in Amur Oblast